Lemberk Castle is a castle in Jablonné v Podještědí in the Liberec Region of the Czech Republic. It is located in the Lusatian Mountains.

Geography
Lemberk Castle is located in the village of Lvová, which is an administrative part of Jablonné v Podještědí, west of Liberec. It is located in the heart of the Lusatian Mountains.

History
Lemberk Castle was constructed in the 1240s by Havel of Markvartice. In the second half of the 16th century it was rebuilt into a Renaissance chateau and it acquired its present appearance after the mid-17th century under the lords of Breda. The last owners were the Clam-Gallas family, who owned the castle until 1945.

Today
Today only the cylindrical tower is still standing from the original structure. The castle is now state owned and accessible to public in the form of organized tours.

References

External links

Pictures

Jablonné v Podještědí
Castles in the Liberec Region
National Cultural Monuments of the Czech Republic